Camp Creek may refer to:

Australia 

 Camp Creek, Queensland, a locality in the Cassowary Coast Region

United States 
There are over one thousand places in the United States named Camp Creek, including several hundred streams:

Streams

Camp Creek (El Dorado County, California)
Camp Creek (Tuolumne County, California)
Camp Creek (Fulton County, Georgia)
Camp Creek (Gwinnett County, Georgia)
Camp Creek (Clayton County, Georgia)
Camp Creek (Henry County, Georgia), site of the 1900 Camp Creek train wreck.
Camp Creek (Union County, Georgia)
Camp Creek (Iowa)
Camp Creek (Root River), a stream in Fillmore County, Minnesota
Camp Creek (Cuivre River), a stream in Missouri
Camp Creek (Salt River), a stream in Missouri
Camp Creek (Wolf Creek), a stream in Missouri
Camp Creek (Eagle Creek tributary), a stream in Holt County, Nebraska
Camp Creek (Sandy River), on the western side of Mount Hood in Oregon
Camp Creek (South Carolina)
Camp Creek (Johnson County, Texas)
Camp Creek (Virginia)

Other places

 Camp Creek State Park, in rural Mercer County, West Virginia
 Camp Creek, Tennessee, an unincorporated community in Greene County, Tennessee
 Camp Creek Lake, Robertson County, Texas